Livan-e Sharqi (also Romanized as Līvān-e Sharqī) is a village in Livan Rural District, Now Kandeh District, Bandar-e Gaz County, Golestan Province, Iran. At the 2006 census, its population was 2,410, in 683 families.

References 

Populated places in Bandar-e Gaz County